Jan Moravec (born 13 July 1987) is a Czech footballer who plays for FC Zbrojovka Brno.

External links
 Profile at iDNES.cz

1987 births
Living people
Czech footballers
Association football defenders
Czech First League players
Bohemians 1905 players
SK Kladno players
FC Zbrojovka Brno players
MFK Karviná players
People from Svitavy
Czech National Football League players
Sportspeople from the Pardubice Region